Peter Cornelius Schaffnit (June 29, 1903 – April 4, 1959) was a professional football player in the National Football League. He made his NFL debut in 1926 with the Los Angeles Buccaneers. He played only one season in the league.

Prior to joining the NFL, Pete played college football at the University of California at Berkeley.

Notes

External links

1903 births
1959 deaths
Players of American football from Colorado
California Golden Bears football players
Los Angeles Buccaneers players